Murano Lighthouse is an active lighthouse located in the south east part of the island of Murano in the Venetian Lagoon on the Adriatic Sea.

Description
The first lighthouse, built in 1912, was a metal skeletal tower on piles, which was deactivated in 1934 when became operational the current. The tower is painted white, on the upper stage are painted two black horizontal bands facing the range line, on the east side, in order to have the lighthouse more visible during the day.

The lighthouse is completely automated and managed by the Marina Militare with the identification code number 4177.2 E.F.

The lighthouse is completely automated and managed by the Marina Militare with the identification code number 4177.1 E.F.

See also
 List of lighthouses in Italy
 Murano

References

External links
 Servizio Fari Marina Militare
 

Lighthouses in Italy
Buildings and structures in Veneto